Clivina floridae is a species of ground beetle in the subfamily Scaritinae. It was described by Csiki in 1927.

References

floridae
Beetles described in 1927